CFZZ-FM is a French-language Canadian radio station located in Saint-Jean-sur-Richelieu, Quebec and serving Greater Montreal as a rimshot signal. Owned and operated by Bell Media, it is part of the "Boom" network. As such, the station has an oldies format.

Originally known as CHRS, the station operated on 1090 kHz as one of the very few daytime-only stations in Canada. Thanks to errors from BBM, CHRS once managed in the 1970s a third-place in ratings during evenings—a time when the station was not even on the air. The station added nighttime service in 1988 when it moved to 1040, While the 1090 kHz frequency remains unused, the 1040 frequency was used from 1999 to 2020 by CJMS 1040 in Saint-Constant, just south of Montreal.

The station switched to FM and adopted its current call sign in 1992, going under the name Z-104, Le Rocker Sympathique. Z was a community radio station with a  mainly adult contemporary format.

Power Corporation, which had owned the station since the early 1990s, sold Z-104 to Corus Entertainment in 2000. Ownership of the station changed hands again in 2005 when it was transferred to Astral Media as part of an exchange of assets between Corus and Astral.

Astral Media promptly dropped the "Z" moniker. Community radio programs were abolished and the station was integrated to the "Boom FM" network.

On May 21, 2018, the French-language Boom stations flipped to an adult contemporary format.

CFZZ broadcasts on 104.1 MHz with an effective radiated power of 1,350 watts (class B) using an omnidirectional antenna.

References

External links
 Boom 104,1
 

Fzz
Fzz
Fzz
Fzz
Saint-Jean-sur-Richelieu
Radio stations established in 1956
1956 establishments in Quebec